The Blue Dragon Film Award for Best Actress is one of the awards that is presented annually at the Blue Dragon Film Awards by Sports Chosun, which is typically held at the end of the year.

Winners and nominees

2020s

Multiple wins and nominations

The following individuals received two or more Best Actress awards: 

The following individuals received four or more Best Actress nominations:

Superlatives

References

General references

External links 
  
 

Blue Dragon Film Awards